The Cleveland Infants were a one-year baseball team in the Players' League, a short-lived Major League that existed only for the 1890 season. Owned by Al Johnson, the Infants finished , their lone season, with 55 wins and 75 losses. Their home games were played at Brotherhood Park.

The team
The Infants featured star hitter Pete Browning. Browning had defected to the Players' League from the American Association's Louisville Colonels, who had finished the 1889 season with a 27–111 win–loss record. Browning hit for a .373 batting average in 1890, leading the Players' League. He also led the league in doubles. At one point during the season, he was running the bases and broke up a no-hitter by pitcher Ad Gumbert in the ninth inning of a game. With two outs, Browning was on first base after being hit by a pitch. The batter hit a ground ball and Browning let the ball hit his foot, rendering himself out but crediting the batter with a hit under the rules of that era.

Roster

See also 
1890 Cleveland Infants season

External links 
Team history and Encyclopedia

References

Defunct Major League Baseball teams
Infants
Players' League teams
1890 establishments in Ohio
1890 disestablishments in Ohio
Baseball teams established in 1890
Baseball teams disestablished in 1890
Defunct baseball teams in Ohio